JS Hakugei (SS-514), "White Sperm Whale",  is the second boat of the  attack submarine of Japan Maritime Self-Defense Force. The submarine was ordered from Kawasaki Heavy Industries in 2018 and laid down on 25 January 2019 at Kobe, Japan. Hakugei was launched on 14 October 2021. She was commissioned in March 2023.

Development and design 
The hull design of the Taigei class is said to not differ too much from the operational  but will be 100 tons heavier than its predecessor. However, the Taigei-class submarines will be more advanced as they are equipped with newer equipment such as sonar systems, snorkel power generation system. The Taigei class will use lithium-ion batteries much like JS Ōryū and JS Tōryū of the Sōryū-class submarines. The submarine will likely use the Type 18 torpedo, which project name as "G-RX6". In addition, in response to the lifting of restrictions on the placement of female SDF personnel on submarines, the work of female SDF personnel is being supported by establishing partitions in the living quarters and securing bedrooms for women.

Construction and career 
Hakugei was laid down at Kawasaki Heavy Industries Kobe Shipyard on 25 January 2019 as the 2017 plan 3000-ton submarine No. 8129 based on the medium-term defense capability development plan (26 medium-term defense), and in 2020. It was named Hakugei at the naming and launching ceremony held at the factory on 14 October. Scheduled to be handed over to the Maritime Self-Defense Force in March 2023, the deployment destination is undecided.

Gallery

Citations

Ships built by Kawasaki Heavy Industries
2021 ships
Taigei-class submarines